Action Wellness (formerly ActionAIDS) is a nonprofit organization serving Philadelphia and the greater metro region. The organization was co-founded in 1986 by Anna Forbes, Jim Littrell, and Bob Schoenberg and has long been the largest HIV social service agency in the state of Pennsylvania.

Action Wellness currently serves over 5,000 clients a year through over 350 volunteers and close to 100 professional staff.

History 

In 1986, a group of 84 volunteers came together to provide services to 100 people with AIDS. Gathering in Center City Philadelphia, these volunteers acted; and ActionAIDS was founded. Rev. Jim Littrell became the first administrator of the new organization, with Bob Schoenberg as the first board president, and Anna Forbes as the first staff member.

In 1991, ActionAIDS developed "Dining Out for Life", an annual fundraising event to raise money and awareness for the organization. Five years later the agency sold the newly formed non-profit "Dining Out For Life International" for $1 in an effort to expand the idea to other cities. As of 2010, Dining Out for Life was being held in 53 cities, with 3,500 participating restaurants.

The ActionAIDS office can be seen in the 1993 film Philadelphia. Tom Hanks is shown to enter its office and receive support services for people with HIV and AIDS. Director Jonathan Demme filmed Philadelphia in part on location at ActionAIDS' center city location.

In June 2016, ActionAIDS changed their name to Action Wellness with a new expanded mission to serve those with chronic illnesses as well as those with HIV/AIDS.

Services 

Action Wellness currently serves over 4,000 clients a year through the efforts of over 350 volunteers and 90 professional staff. Services are provided at Action Wellness's five offices and at over 38 host sites throughout the city of Philadelphia.  Medical case management is by far the biggest service offered by ActionAIDS, comprising 56 percent of the 2010 fiscal year expenses. The organization also hosts one of the oldest and largest Buddy Programs in the nation.

Services include:
 Medical Case Management
 Outreach
 Housing Counseling
 Housing at Casa Nueva Vida
 Positive Living
 HIV Testing
 Prevention & Education
 Counseling
 Prison Linkage Program
 Family/Perinatal Program
 Youth Forward Program
 Positive Action Employment Services
 Support Groups
 Advocacy

References

External links
 Action Wellness Website

HIV/AIDS prevention organizations
Organizations based in Philadelphia
Organizations established in 1986
Non-profit organizations based in Pennsylvania
Non-profit organizations based in Philadelphia
HIV/AIDS activism
1986 establishments in Pennsylvania